Stereo is a 2014 German thriller film directed by . The film premiered in the Panorama section of the 64th Berlin International Film Festival. On 5 July 2014 the film was presented at the Vologda Independent Cinema Voices Festival. The North American Premiere was celebrated at the Fantasia International Film Festival in Montreal on 31 July 2014. Stereo opened the South Korean Puchon International Fantastic Film Festival 2014. It was also shown in the "Sang Neuf" (Young Blood) Section at the Beaune Film Festival 2014 and in the International Competition Programme of the Odessa International Film Festival.

Stereo was one of fifteen potential films to be considered as Germany's candidate to the Academy Awards 2015 as the Best Foreign Language Film, but it was not selected.

Cast
 Jürgen Vogel as Erik
 Moritz Bleibtreu as Henry
 Petra Schmidt-Schaller as Julia
 Georg Friedrich as Keitel
 Rainer Bock as Wolfgang
 Mark Zak as Gaspar
 Helene Schönfelder as Helena
 Fabian Hinrichs as physician
 Jürgen Holtz as spiritmend

References

External links
  Official site
 

2014 films
2014 psychological thriller films
German psychological thriller films
2010s German-language films
2010s German films